"Who Says You Can't Go Home" is a song that was written by Jon Bon Jovi and Richie Sambora for American rock band Bon Jovi's ninth album, Have a Nice Day (2005). The song was produced by John Shanks, Jon Bon Jovi and Richie Sambora. A duet version of the song featuring vocals from Jennifer Nettles of the American duo Sugarland was also shipped to country music radio. Both versions of the song feature on Have a Nice Day; the original version appears as the fourth track, while the country version appears as the thirteenth and final track.

"Who Says You Can't Go Home" was released as the second single in North America in March 2006 and reached the top 30 on the US Billboard Hot 100, peaking at number 23. Outside North America, "Welcome to Wherever You Are" served as the second single, with "Who Says You Can't Go Home" being released as the album's third single on June 12, 2006. The song reached number five in the United Kingdom, becoming the band's second top-10 single from the album. The duet with Jennifer Nettles peaked at number one on the Billboard Hot Country Songs chart.

Content
The lyrics of "Who Says You Can't Go Home" reflect Jon Bon Jovi's roots and passion for his hometown in New Jersey.

Country version
In the United States, a version of the song was released to the country music format as a duet with Jennifer Nettles, lead singer of the duo Sugarland. The country music version was originally recorded as a duet with Keith Urban, who also played banjo on the song. After Jon Bon Jovi decided that Urban's voice was too similar to his own, he asked a representative of Mercury Records to recommend a female duet partner. The country version was performed on Saturday Night Live on October 13, 2007.

Music videos
The music video for the country/Jennifer Nettles version, released in November 2005 and directed by Jon's brother, Anthony M. Bongiovi, features Habitat for Humanity volunteers, including members of the Philadelphia Soul Arena Football League team owned in part by Jon Bon Jovi, building homes for low-income families and was used to promote the organization. It won an award for Best Collaborative Video at the CMT Music Awards in 2006.

The shooting of the music video for the regular version, featuring a man dressed up as a dog, began at the March 9, 2006 Bon Jovi concert at the Glendale Arena outside Phoenix and continued in the Los Angeles area. The video was released in the week of March 27, 2006. It was directed by Jeff Labbé through @radical.media, lensed by David Lanzenberg, and edited by Steve Prestemon.

2008 Presidential Election
During the 2008 US Presidential election, the original version of "Who Says You Can't Go Home" was used frequently at public events supporting the Republican Party. Specifically, the song was a prominent feature at several large rallies supporting vice-presidential candidate and former Governor of Alaska Sarah Palin. This use of the song quickly became part of a controversy over several different songs that Republican candidates had been using without the artists' permission, including music by Foo Fighters, Heart, John Mellencamp, and Boston. The Republicans, in turn, claimed "blanket rights" to play the songs at their public events.

In launching the complaint, Bon Jovi stated,
"We were not asked... we do not approve of their use of [the song]. We wrote this song as a thank you to those who have supported us over the past 25 years. The song has since become a banner for our home state of New Jersey and the de facto theme song for our partnerships around the country to build homes and rebuild communities."

Bon Jovi has been an enthusiastic Democratic Party supporter, appearing at a $30,000-per-plate fundraiser in support of President Barack Obama and performing at rallies for various Democratic candidates.

Awards and achievements
 Won award for "Best Collaborative Video" at the CMT Music Awards in 2006.
 Won award for "Favorite Rock Song" at the 33rd People's Choice Awards in 2007
 Won the Grammy Award for Best Country Collaboration with Vocals in 2007
 Song has been chosen to group best Country songs of the year - "ASCAP Country Music Awards" in 2006
 Nominated for "Music Event of the Year" at the Country Music Association Awards
 Nominated for "Vocal Event of the Year" at the Academy of Country Music Awards

Track listings
UK CD1 and 7-inch picture disc
 "Who Says You Can't Go Home" (radio edit)
 "Complicated" (live in Boston, Massachusetts, December 10, 2005)

UK CD2
 "Who Says You Can't Go Home"
 "Last Man Standing" (live)
 "Raise Your Hands" (live)
 "Who Says You Can't Go Home" (video)

Digital download
 "Who Says You Can't Go Home" (acoustic version) – 4:21

Charts

Weekly charts

Year-end charts

Release history

References

External links
Music video: 

2005 songs
2006 singles
Bon Jovi songs
Island Records singles
Jennifer Nettles songs
Vocal collaborations
Mercury Records singles
Song recordings produced by John Shanks
Songs written by Jon Bon Jovi
Songs written by Richie Sambora